36th Street station is a SEPTA trolley station in Philadelphia. It is located at the intersection of Sansom and 36th Streets, and serves Routes 11, 13, 34, and 36 of the SEPTA subway–surface trolley lines. Trolleys serving this station go eastbound to Center City Philadelphia and westbound to the neighborhoods of Eastwick and Angora, as well as the Delaware County suburbs of Yeadon and Darby.

The station is located adjacent to the Institute of Contemporary Art and is two blocks away from the 36th Street Portal station, which serves the Route 10 trolley.

History 

The station was opened in November 1955 by the Philadelphia Transportation Company (PTC) as part of a larger project to move portions of the elevated Market Street Line and surface trolleys underground. The original project to bury the elevated tracks between 23rd to 46th streets was announced by the PTC's predecessor, the Philadelphia Rapid Transit Company (PRT), in the 1920s, but was delayed due to the Great Depression and World War II. The PTC's revised project also included a new tunnel for trolleys underneath the campus of the University of Pennsylvania, continuing from the original western portal at 23rd and Market streets to new portals at 36th and Ludlow streets and 40th Street and Baltimore Avenue.

The station is also sometimes known as Sansom Common station, referring to a former name used by the University of Pennsylvania to market retail in the area.

Station layout 
The station has two low-level side platforms, each capable of platforming two trolleys at a time. Fares are collected manually on board the trolley cars.

References

External links 

Images at NYCSubway.org

SEPTA Subway–Surface Trolley Line stations
Railway stations in Philadelphia
Railway stations located underground in Pennsylvania